John Brace (born c. 1578) was an English politician who sat in the House of Commons  from 1604 to 1611.

Brace was the son of Philip Brace of Worcestershire. He matriculated at Exeter College, Oxford on 8 November 1594 aged 16.  In 1604, he was elected Member of Parliament for Droitwich. Brace was of Hill Court, Worcestershire. He married Cecily Sandys daughter of Sir Samuel Sandys of Ombersley. He had sons Philip and Edwin.

References

1570s births
Year of death missing
Year of birth uncertain
Alumni of Exeter College, Oxford
Members of the Parliament of England for Droitwich
English MPs 1604–1611